Gladys Jennings (1903–1994) was an English actress.

Selected filmography
 The Lady Clare (1919)
 The Face at the Window (1920)
 The Shuttle of Life (1920)
 The Prey of the Dragon (1921)
 Gwyneth of the Welsh Hills (1921)
 Rob Roy (1922)
 Man and His Kingdom (1922)
 Lamp in the Desert (1923)
 Constant Hot Water (1923)
 Little Miss Nobody (1923)
 Young Lochinvar (1923)
 Henry, King of Navarre (1924)
 The Prude's Fall (1925)
 The Happy Ending (1925)
 The Lady Godiva (1928)
 I'm an Explosive (1933)
 Lilies of the Field (1934)
 Alibi Inn (1935)

References

External links

1903 births
1994 deaths
20th-century English actresses
Actresses from Oxfordshire
English film actresses
English silent film actresses
People from Oxford